The Continuation is the third full-length album by the Japanese band Deathgaze. It was released on September 9, 2009.

Track listing

Notes

External links
DEATHGAZE Official band website
DEATHGAZE Official MySpace profile
Enter Brain Official label site

Deathgaze albums
2008 albums